Baxter is a studio album released by Swedish electronica band, Baxter on September 15, 1998 (see 1998 in music). This is the debut album by the band and was released on Warner Bros. Records through its subsidiary Maverick Records.  It was recorded in the early months of 1997 and is self produced.

Track listing 
All songs composed by Ricky Tillblad, Carl Herlofsson, and Nina Ramsby as Baxter.
Television – 4:41
Fading – 5:52
Love Again – 3:41
I Can’t See Why – 4:53
Ballad of Behaviour – 4:43
Political – 6:34
Possible – 3:48
All of My Pride – 4:39
So Much I’ve Heard – 4:35
Oh My Love – 4:55
+ I Can't See Why (Yoga Remix) – 7:00 	
+ I Can't See Why (Baxter Remix) - 6:22 	
+ I Can't See Why (Skylab Remix) - 5:28

+ Japan only release.

Personnel
Ricky Tillblad – programming, bassline, lyrics, rhythm, final mix
Carl Herlofsson – programming, string arrangements, mixing, trumpet, melody, rhythm, final mix
Nina Ramsby – lead vocals, guitar, melodica, melody, lyrics, string arrangements, final mix
Björn Engelmann Cutting Room Studios – mastering

References

1998 albums
Baxter (electronica band) albums
Trip hop albums by Swedish artists